Samuel Maurice Hicks Jr., known professionally as S. Maurice Hicks Jr., (born December 5, 1952) is a United States district judge of the United States District Court for the Western District of Louisiana.

Education and career

Born in New Orleans, Hicks received a Bachelor of Arts degree from Texas Christian University in 1974 and a Juris Doctor from the Paul M. Hebert Law Center at Louisiana State University in 1977. He was a law clerk and staff attorney of the Louisiana Legislative Council from 1975 to 1977. He was in private practice in Shreveport, Louisiana, from 1977 to 2003.

District court service

On September 12, 2002, Hicks was nominated by President George W. Bush to a seat on the United States District Court for the Western District of Louisiana vacated by Donald Ellsworth Walter. Hicks was confirmed by the United States Senate on May 19, 2003, and received his commission on May 21, 2003. He served as chief judge from November 3, 2017 to December 5, 2022, being mandated to step down on his 70th birthday.

Sources

1952 births
Living people
21st-century American judges
Judges of the United States District Court for the Western District of Louisiana
Louisiana lawyers
Louisiana State University Law Center alumni
People from New Orleans
Texas Christian University alumni
United States district court judges appointed by George W. Bush